The Women's omnium competition at the 2021 UCI Track Cycling World Championships was held on 22 October 2021.

Qualifying
The first 12 riders in each heat advance.

Heat 1
The race was started at 13:00.

Heat 2
The race was started at 13:23.

Results

Scratch race
The race was started at 14:19.

Tempo race
The race was started at 14:19.

Elimination race
The race was started at 19:34.

Points race and overall standings
The points race was started at 21:01.

References

Women's omnium